4-Hydroxy-3-methylbut-2-enyl diphosphate reductase (isopentenyl-diphosphate:NADP+ oxidoreductase, LytB, (E)-4-hydroxy-3-methylbut-2-en-1-yl diphosphate reductase, HMBPP reductase, IspH, LytB/IspH) is an enzyme in the non-mevalonate pathway. It acts upon (E)-4-Hydroxy-3-methyl-but-2-enyl pyrophosphate (or "HMB-PP").

 (1) isopentenyl diphosphate + NAD(P)+ + H2O  (E)-4-hydroxy-3-methylbut-2-en-1-yl diphosphate + NAD(P)H + H+
 (2) dimethylallyl diphosphate + NAD(P)+ + H2O  (E)-4-hydroxy-3-methylbut-2-en-1-yl diphosphate + NAD(P)H + H+

4-Hydroxy-3-methylbut-2-enyl diphosphate reductase is an iron-sulfur protein that contains either a [3Fe-4S] or a [4Fe-4S] cluster.

References 

EC 1.17.1